O'Toole is an Irish surname. It may refer to:

People 
 O'Toole family, a leading family in Gaelic Leinster
 O'Toole (surname)

Other uses
 Erin O'Toole, (b. 1973) former leader of the Opposition of Canada and former leader of the Conservative Party of Canada
 Peter O'Toole (1932-2013), British actor
 Annette O'Toole (b. 1952) American actress, dancer, and singer-songwriter
 O'Tooles GAC football and hurling club in Dublin
 Ensign O'Toole, a military sitcom starring Dean Jones, which aired on NBC, 1962-1963
 Ensign O'Toole and Me, the title of a semi-autobiographical novel by William Lederer
 Kevin F. O'Toole (1950), American lawyer, attorney and gaming regulator
 Plenty O'Toole, James Bond girl
 Slugger O'Toole, Irish weblog
 St. Laurence O'Toole Pipe Band
 Sneakers O'Toole Family Guy Character (Boys Do Cry)
 Timmy O'Toole Bart's fictional character who fell down a well in an episode of the Simpsons
 , the name of more than one United States Navy ship

See also
 Other anglicizations of ó Tuathail: 
 Tohill
 Toal (disambiguation)